Twin-turbo (not to be confused with a twincharger setup, which is a combination of a supercharger and a turbocharger) refers to an engine in which two turbochargers work in tandem to compress the intake fuel/air mixture (or intake air, in the case of a direct-injection engine). The most common layout features two identical or mirrored turbochargers in parallel, each processing half of a V engine's produced exhaust through independent piping. The two turbochargers can either be matching or different sizes.

Types and combinations 
There are three types of turbine setups used for twin-turbo setups: 

 Parallel
 Sequential
 Series

These can be applied to any of the five types of compressor setups (which theoretically could have 15 different setups):

 Compound Compressors
 Staged Compound Compressors
 Staged Sequential Compressors
 Parallel Sequential Compressors
 Parallel Compressors

Parallel 

A parallel configuration refers to using two equally-sized turbochargers which each receive half of the exhaust gases. Some designs combine the intake charge from each turbocharger into a single intake manifold, while others use a separate intake manifold for each turbocharger.

Parallel configurations are well suited to V6 and V8 engines since each turbocharger can be assigned to one cylinder bank, reducing the amount of exhaust piping needed. In this case, each turbocharger is fed exhaust gases by a separate exhaust manifold. For four-cylinder engines and straight-six engines, both turbochargers can be mounted to a single exhaust manifold.

The aim of using parallel twin-turbos is to reduce turbo lag by being able to use smaller turbochargers than if a single turbocharger was used for the engine. On engines with multiple cylinder banks (e.g. V engines and flat engines) use of parallel twin-turbos can also simplify the exhaust system.

The 1981-1994 Maserati Biturbo was the first production car to use twin-turbochargers. The Biturbo used a 90-degree SOHC V6 engine with one turbocharger per cylinder bank.

Parallel configurations have also been used on engines with more than two turbochargers. One example is the 1991-1995 Bugatti EB110, which uses four turbochargers on its V12 engine. The 2005-2015 Bugatti Veyron uses four turbochargers on its W16 engine. 

In diesel powered applications, notable examples are Volkswagen's V10 TDI which uses two BorgWarner turbochargers in a parallel layout and BMW's inline 6 B57 engine (B57D30O0, B57D30T0, B57D30S0), which is available in configurations of up to 4 turbochargers that operate in a double-series layout.

Sequential 
Sequential turbocharging refer to a set-up in which the engine uses one turbocharger for lower engine speeds, and a second or both turbochargers at higher engine speeds. This system is intended to overcome the limitation of large turbochargers providing insufficient boost at low RPM. On the other hand, smaller turbos are effective at low RPM (when there is less kinetic energy present in the exhaust gases) but are unable to provide the quantity of compressed intake gases required at higher RPM. Therefore, sequential turbocharger systems provide a way to decrease turbo lag without compromising power output at high RPM.

The system is arranged so that a small ("primary") turbocharger is active while the engine is operating at low RPM, which reduces the boost threshold (RPM at which effective boost is provided) and turbo lag. As RPM increases, a small amount of exhaust gas is fed to the larger ("secondary") turbocharger, to bring it up to operating speed. Then at high RPM, all of the exhaust gases are directed to the secondary turbocharger, so that it can provide the boost required by the engine at high RPM.

The first production car to use sequential turbocharging was the 1986-1988 Porsche 959, which used sequential twin-turbos on its flat-six engine. Sequential turbocharging can also be used with more than two turbochargers, such as in the 2012-2017 BMW N57S straight-six diesel engine, which uses three sequential turbos.

Series 
Serial turbocharging is where the turbochargers are connected in series with the output of the first turbocharger then being further compressed by the second turbocharger and in some cases powering the larger turbine.

A sequential turbo can also be of use to a system where the output pressure must be greater than can be provided by a single turbo, commonly called a compound twin-turbo system.  In this case, multiple similarly sized turbochargers are used in sequence, but constantly operating.  The first turbo boosts provides the initial compression (for example to three times the intake pressure).  Subsequent turbos take the charge from the previous stage and compress it further (for example to an additional three times intake pressure, for a total boost of nine times atmospheric pressure).

A downside of staged turbocharging is that it often leads to large amounts of turbo lag, therefore it is mostly used on piston engine aircraft which usually do not need to rapidly raise and lower engine speed. (and thus where turbo lag is not a primary design consideration), and where the intake pressure is quite low due to low atmospheric pressure at altitude, requiring a very high pressure ratio. High-performance diesel engines also sometimes use this configuration, since diesel engines do not suffer from pre-ignition issues and can therefore use high boost pressures.

Quad-turbo

Automobile manufacturers rarely use more than two turbochargers. Some exceptions are the triple-turbocharger system used by the 2012-2017 BMW N57S straight-six diesel engine, the quad-turbocharger system used by the V12 engine in the 1991-1995 Bugatti EB110 and the quad-turbocharger system used by the W16 engine in the 2005-2015 Bugatti Veyron and 2016-present Bugatti Chiron.

See also

References

External links 
http://mkiv.supras.org.nz/articles/twinturbosetups.htm

Turbochargers